Iskut River Hot Springs Provincial Park is a  provincial park in British Columbia, Canada, located on the western side of the Iskut River.

The extremely hot waters flowing out of the ground at Iskut River Hot Springs Provincial Park are heated by magma of the Northern Cordilleran Volcanic Province.

See also
Volcanism of Canada
Volcanism of Western Canada

References

BC Parks: Iskut River Hot Springs Provincial Park

Provincial parks of British Columbia
Stikine Country
Hot springs of British Columbia
2001 establishments in British Columbia
Protected areas established in 2001